Parakənd is a village and municipality in the Lankaran Rayon of Azerbaijan. It has a population of 1,149.

References

Populated places in Lankaran District